KCRR is a radio station in Iowa serving Waterloo, Cedar Falls, and surrounding cities with a classic rock format. This station broadcasts on FM frequency 97.7 MHz and is owned by Townsquare Media. Elwin Huffman serves as morning news host. KCRR carries the Dwyer and Michaels Morning Show.

On August 30, 2013, a deal was announced in which Townsquare Media would acquire 53 Cumulus stations, including KCRR, for $238 million. The deal was part of Cumulus' acquisition of Dial Global; Townsquare and Dial Global are both controlled by Oaktree Capital Management. The sale to Townsquare was completed on November 14, 2013; KCRR was one of three stations (along with KKHQ-FM and KOEL-FM) that were placed in a divestiture trust for eventual resale within two years. In December 2016, the Federal Communications Commission approved Townsquare's request to reacquire the stations from the divestiture trust.

References

External links
97.7 KCRR - Official Website

CRR
Classic rock radio stations in the United States
Radio stations established in 1983
Townsquare Media radio stations